Sea of Noise is the second studio album by American band St. Paul and The Broken Bones. It was released on September 9, 2016, by Records. The lead single "All I Ever Wonder" was released on June 16, 2016. The album was produced by Paul Butler.

Background
On May 23, 2016, Rolling Stone reported that St. Paul and The Broken Bones were to release Sea of Noise on September 9, 2016. A trailer for the album, which shows the band recording album track "Crumbling Light Posts Pt. 1" with the Tennessee Mass Choir, was released in conjunction. Sea of Noise is the first album by the band since the departure of trombonist Ben Griner in May 2015.

Singles
The album was preceded by the release of the lead single "All I Ever Wonder" on June 16, 2016. The song was inspired by vocalist Paul Janeway's apathy towards multiple issues, and the song addresses topics such as gentrification and politics.

Critical reception

Upon release, Sea of Noise received positive acclaim from music critics. At Metacritic, which assigns a normalized rating out of 100 based on reviews from critics, the album has an average score of 80 based on 5 critic reviews, indicating "generally favorable reviews".

Ann Powers of NPR wrote that the album "lifts [St. Paul and The Broken Bones] from its spot as the nation's best young party band into headier and more exciting territory," and highlighted how the album is relevant in current times by noting that several of the album's tracks address topics such as racial injustice and political unrest.

Track listing

Personnel
Credits for Sea of Noise adapted from Tidal and AllMusic

Musicians
 St. Paul and The Broken Bones – composers, lyricists
 Jason Clark and the Tennessee Choir – additional vocals (1, 7, 13)
 Yennifer Correia – violin
 Jonathan Kirkscey – cello
 Jessie Munson – violin
 Jennifer Puckett – viola

Technical
 Paul Butler – production, mixing
 Jeff Powell – engineering
 Mike Stankiewicz – assistant engineering
 Wesley Graham – assistant engineering
 Greg Calbi – mastering engineering
 Steve Fallone – mastering engineering
 Lester Snell – string arrangements

Design
 Aaron Gresham – art direction

Charts

References

2016 albums